Bi Fujian (born 16 January 1959), also known by his nickname Laobi, is a Chinese director, television host and professor. Bi is the long-time host of the singing competition franchise Xingguang Dadao (Avenue of Stars), and has been a host on the CCTV New Year's Gala variety entertainment program from 2012 to 2015.

Biography
Bi was born in Jinzhou District of Dalian City, Liaoning Province on 16 January 1959, the sixth of seven children.

Bi attended Fenglin School, Wangjia School, Dalian No. 12 Middle School, and Dalian No. 2 Middle School.

During the Down to the Countryside Movement Bi became a sent-down youth, working in the mostly rural Pulandian area near Dalian from 1976 to 1978. After the Cultural Revolution, Bi joined the Navy and served for seven years, initially joining the Beihai Fleet. In 1984 he joined a military expedition to in Antarctica.

Bi left the military and entered Communication University of China in 1985, majoring in directing. He graduated in 1989.

Career 
After graduating, in June 1989, he began working for China Central Television as a junior director in its arts and entertainment department. In 1994 he took part in the filming of Romance of the Three Kingdoms as a camera specialist. In 1995 he visited the Arctic. In 1997, Bi became a host of Dream Theater. Beginning in 2004, Bi hosted Xingguang Dadao, an "Idol"-style singing competition franchise also known as Avenue of Stars.

In October 2011, Bi became a part-time visiting professor at Shandong University. Since 2012, Bi has been a host on the annual CCTV New Year's Gala, known for his natural presentation style, sense of humour, and improvisation skills.

In January 2014, at the season finale of the Avenue of Stars competition, Bi came out dressed as a Buddhist religious figure and performed a song that was seen as mocking the Buddhist religion. Buddhist groups in the country protested and Bi apologised.

In April 2015, an online video surfaced of Bi Fujian attending a dinner party and making irreverent remarks that were seen as critical of Mao. He made sarcastic remarks such as "Uh, don't mention that old son of a bitch, he tormented us!", believed to be a reference to Mao, as he sang lines from Mao-era opera Taking Tiger Mountain by Strategy while entertaining his friends. Due to this incident, CCTV suspended all programs hosted by Bi, started from 8 April to 11 April 2015. Bi was suspended by CCTV on 10 April.

On December 19, 2015, Bi Fujian participated in a charity event at Jilin Normal University, in Siping, northeast China's Jilin province.

Personal life
Bi was married in 1991. His daughter, Bi Ling, also known as Jiaojiao, was born in July 1996. The couple divorced in 2004, and his daughter immigrated to Canada with her mother. Bi enjoys calligraphy, drawing comics, and playing basketball.

Works

Television
 Dream Theater
 Xingguang Dadao, also known as Avenue of Stars
 CCTV New Year's Gala (2012-2015)

Sketch comedy
 Don't got money
 Got the money now

Single
 Racecourse
 The Beautiful Girl is going to Marry
 Laobi's Love

Notes and references

1959 births
People from Dalian
Communication University of China alumni
Living people
CCTV television presenters
Educators from Liaoning